FreeMat is a free open-source numerical computing environment and programming language, similar to MATLAB and GNU Octave. In addition to supporting many MATLAB functions and some IDL functionality, it features a codeless interface to external C, C++, and Fortran code, further parallel distributed algorithm development (via MPI), and has plotting and 3D visualization capabilities. Community support takes place in moderated Google Groups.

See also 

 Comparison of numerical-analysis software

Notes 

Array programming languages
Free mathematics software
Free software primarily written in assembly language
Free software programmed in C
Free software programmed in C++
Free software programmed in Fortran
Numerical analysis software for Linux
Numerical analysis software for macOS
Numerical analysis software for Windows
Numerical programming languages
Science software that uses Qt
Unix programming tools